Euprenolepis negrosensis is an ant species that belongs to the genus Euprenolepis. Described by Wheeler in 1930, they are normally found in South East Asia.

References

Formicinae
Insects described in 1930
Hymenoptera of Asia